Henry John May was the Dean of St George's Cathedral, Georgetown, Guyana, from 1890 until 1893. Previously he had been priest in charge at Enmore, Guyana, Vicar of St Swithin's, West Bank Demerara  and the Rural Dean of Mindenburg.

Notes

Deans of St George's Cathedral, Georgetown

1893 deaths
Year of birth unknown